Greggory Da-marr Johnson (born October 20, 1958) is a former American football Defensive back who played for the Seattle Seahawks and St. Louis Cardinals of the National Football League (NFL). He played college football at Oklahoma State University.

References 

Living people
Oklahoma State Cowboys football players
1958 births
American football defensive backs
Seattle Seahawks players
St. Louis Cardinals (football) players